The number of transfer units (NTU) method is used to calculate the rate of heat transfer in heat exchangers (especially counter current exchangers) when there is insufficient information to calculate the log mean temperature difference (LMTD). In heat exchanger analysis, if the fluid inlet and outlet temperatures are specified or can be determined by simple energy balance, the LMTD method can be used; but when these temperatures are not available either the NTU or the effectiveness NTU method is used.

The effectiveness-NTU method is very useful for all the flow arrangements (besides parallel flow and counterflow ones) because the effectiveness of all other types must be obtained by a numerical solution of the partial differential equations and there is no analytical equation for LMTD or effectiveness, but as a function of two variables the effectiveness for each type can be presented in a single diagram.

To define the effectiveness of a heat exchanger we need to find the maximum possible heat transfer that can be hypothetically achieved in a counter-flow heat exchanger of infinite length.

A quantity:

 
 
is then found, where  is the maximum heat that could be transferred between the fluids per unit time.  must be used as it is the fluid with the lowest heat capacity rate that would, in this hypothetical infinite length exchanger, actually undergo the maximum possible temperature change. The other fluid would change temperature more slowly along the heat exchanger length. The method, at this point, is concerned only with the fluid undergoing the maximum temperature change.

The effectiveness, is the ratio between the actual heat transfer rate and the maximum possible heat transfer rate:

where:

Effectiveness is a dimensionless quantity between 0 and 1. If we know  for a particular heat exchanger, and we know the inlet conditions of the two flow streams we can calculate the amount of heat being transferred between the fluids by:

For any heat exchanger it can be shown that:

For a given geometry,  can be calculated using correlations in terms of the "heat capacity ratio"

and the number of transfer units, 

 

For example, the effectiveness of a parallel flow heat exchanger is calculated with:

Or the effectiveness of a counter-current flow heat exchanger is calculated with:

For a balanced counter-current flow heat exchanger (balanced meaning , which is a scenario desirable to reduce entropy):

In this special case the heat exchanger behavior is independent of the flow arrangement and the effectiveness is given by:

The effectiveness-NTU relationships for crossflow heat exchangers and various types of shell and tube heat exchangers can be derived only numerically by solving a set of partial differential equations. So, there is no analytical formula for their effectiveness, but just a table of numbers or a diagram. These relationships are differentiated from one another depending (in shell and tube exchangers) on the type of the overall flow scheme (counter-current, concurrent, or cross flow, and the number of passes) and (for the crossflow type) whether any or both flow streams are mixed or unmixed perpendicular to their flow directions.

References 

 F. P. Incropera & D. P. DeWitt 1990 Fundamentals of Heat and Mass Transfer, 3rd edition, pp. 658–660.  Wiley, New York
 F. P. Incropera, D. P. DeWitt, T. L. Bergman & A. S. Lavine 2006 Fundamentals of Heat and Mass Transfer ,6th edition, pp 686–688. John Wiley & Sons US

Heat transfer